The Men's Qatar Classic 2011 is the men's edition of the 2011 Qatar Classic squash tournament, which is a PSA World Series platinum event ($150,000 prize money). The event took place in Doha from 16 October to 21 October. Grégory Gaultier won his first Qatar Classic trophy, beating James Willstrop in the final.

Prize money and ranking points
For 2011, the prize purse was $150,000. The prize money and points breakdown is as follows:

Seeds

Draw and results

See also
Qatar Classic
Women's Qatar Classic 2011
2011 Men's World Open Squash Championship
PSA World Tour 2011
PSA World Series 2011

References

External links
PSA Qatar Classic 2011 website
Qatar Classic 2011 Squashsite website
Qatar Squash Federation website

Squash tournaments in Qatar
Men's Qatar Classic (squash)
Men's Qatar Classic (squash)